Mmmm is one of several spellings of an onomatopoeic expression (also Mmmh etc.)

MMMM or Mmmm may refer to:
General Francisco J. Mujica International Airport, Mexican airport, ICAO code: MMMM
 4000 (number) expressed in Roman numbers
 The indication that a month should be written as a word, in some  Date formats
MM Mickey Mouse Mystery Magazine
Major Minor's Majestic March, videogame
Marvin's Marvelous Mechanical Museum, an album by Tally Hall
 Megalocornea-mental retardation syndrome, related to Megalocornea
Mmmm!, a 2008 album by Floor Thirteen
"Mmmm", a song by DJ Python from Mas Amable